Marco Stier (born 26 March 1984) is a German former professional footballer who played as a midfielder. He represented Germany internationally at youth levels U17 through U20.

Club career
Born in Hamburg, Stier joined SV Werder Bremen's youth system from FC St. Pauli in 1999. After prolific seasons with the Under-17 and Under-19 sides he signed his first professional contract with the club in 2001. In March 2002, he made his senior debut with SV Werder Bremen II in the third-tier Regionalliga Nord against Dresdner SC and scored with his first touch.

Stier joined Bayern Munich in summer 2006 and was to play initially for the reserves. He had to wait two years to make his debut, owing to injuries, and left Bayern Munich II on 26 January 2009 to join Holstein Kiel.

International career
Stier was a Germany youth international playing for youth levels U17 through U20.

References

External links
 
 

1984 births
Living people
Footballers from Hamburg
German footballers
Association football midfielders
Germany youth international footballers
3. Liga players
FC St. Pauli players
SC Concordia von 1907 players
SV Werder Bremen II players
FC Bayern Munich II players
Holstein Kiel players
Hallescher FC players